Koupaki or Koupakio (Greek: Κουπάκι or Κουπάκιον) is a Greek village in the municipal unit of Vardousia, located in the northwestern part of Phocis, west of the Mornos dam and 5 km from Krokyleio, the former seat of Vardousia. Population: 65 (2011 census). In recent years, very few remain during winter months but over 200 during summer months.

Geography 

Much of the area is mountainous, forested (oaks and pines) and pastureland suitable for livestock production, although in earlier times mixed livestock and crop cultivation was extensively practiced. The village lies on the east-facing side of colline Pyrgos. A couple of small streams pass through the village but are dry most of the year except during the rainy winter season.  At over  altitude, it gets snow nearly every winter but overall the village enjoys mild winters and a very attractive climate year round.

History 

Based on historical accounts from the greater area, Koupaki was inhabited before 2000 B.C. by the Pelasgians, who were then invaded by the Dorians whose presence for a long time gave the name Dorida to the greater region. The Aetolians followed from the 13th century B.C. onwards and the area was later invaded by Achaeans, Macedonians, Galatians, Romans and Goths culminating with the destruction of the ancient city of Doris. Later, it was the turn of the Slavs, the Bulgarians, the Catalans, Normans and finally the Ottoman Turks, with the fall of Constantinople in 1453 A.D.

Until about 200 A.D. religious beliefs in the greater area were dominated by idol worshiping and polytheism. The Oracle of Delphi exerted considerable influence throughout the Greek world as a source of wise counsel or prophetic opinion, usually spiritual in nature. It is of no surprise that Christianity could not easily match the infallible authority of the oracle and it is said that it took over 100 years for the region to accept the new dogma.

For nearly 400 years under Ottoman occupation, poor and mountainous villages like Koupaki were not favorite places for the Turks. However, a location near Koupaki which is known as Maraveli was at some period during the Ottoman occupation the "property" of a Turk with the likely name Omar Avel or Abel (from whom the area apparently took its name).  It is said that the Maraveli area was used as pastureland for livestock to supply the needs of the Turk who resided in one of the larger towns of the Mornos valley to the south, as the Turks preferred wealthier and more fertile areas as well as the security and social structure offered by larger towns. In fact, this relative isolation and ethnic purity of mountainous people like Koupaki brought with it pride and a sense of purity and superiority relative to those of the lowlands. Although the latter had no alternative but to cohabitate with the Turks, this was considered as capitulation and as shameful compromise by the mountainous people.

The Greek War of Independence in 1821  against the Ottoman Turks found the rugged mountainous villages in the forefront of the revolution. On October 1828 Dorida was finally liberated and the province of Sterea Hellas (literally the 'Solid Greece') together with the Peloponnese in the south comprised the new Greek Nation.   In 1837, less than 10 years after liberation, Koupaki was recognized as an independent community by the Greek government and became part of the municipality of Krokyleion. Koupaki is referred to as a distinct community for the first time around 1800 by the French Historian and traveler Charles Pouqueville, who refers to the village as Copaki.

The present location of the village formed the nucleus for smaller settlements around it.  Slowly the inhabitants of these peripheral settlements moved to the main central village location.  In addition, starting around 1830 the village saw an influx of people from the area around the town of Missolonghi, to the west of Sterea Hellas. The town's heroic resistance to the Turks, who besieged it twice both from the sea and land in the mid-1820s, became a legend. The descriptions of heroism from the besieged city moved all Greeks, including Koupaki, to open their welcoming arms; but it also reached far away places and several world personalities of the time came to the town's rescue. Among them was the acclaimed British poet Lord Byron, who fought and died in  Missolonghi in 1826. The few from  Missolonghi who survived the daring exodus in 1826, took to the mountains and several arrived at Koupaki and other villages of Dorida. Some of the newcomers from  Missolonghi actually originated from the region of Epirus, a ragged mountainous region in the north-west of Greece. They had moved south into the province of Sterea Hellas, already fighting for its independence, in order to assist the war and breath the first air of freedom.

By 1845 the construction of the main village church had started, exclusively with the local gray stone and oak beams.  This work was completed by means of personal voluntary labour offered by men and women. The engravings seen today on cornerstones of the church are still immensely inspiring. They reflect deep spirituality and a tribute to the institution that preserved Orthodoxy and the Greek language and culture for almost 400 years.

Towards the end of the 19th century and the beginning of the 20th, a large number of young men from Koupaki headed for the New World.  Many of them worked in building the railway network in America, others served in the restaurant business, a tradition that lasted for a long time.  They left with the intention to return but many of them never did and many more from their extended family and friends followed their path.  This was the beginning of the gradual decay of the village which accelerated further during the 1920s and 1940s with new destinations such as Canada, Australia and New Zealand.

The people 

Family names in Koupaki, as elsewhere in rural Greece and beyond, were formed by a combination of the father's first name (e.g. Panos) and the offspring's own name (e.g. Kostas). So the offspring would be known as Panokostas and this would often be adopted as the family name for that branch of the family. Similarly, Mitros an offspring of Giannis would go by the name Giannomitros, etc. If the father was more prominent in the community and known as a craftsman or held an official position, the father's trade could often become the first part of the family name e.g. for a priest (Papas in Greek) carrying the name Andreas, the family name would become Papandreas.   Finally, physical characteristics would also play a role in giving family names. For example, if Andreas happened to be relatively short (Kontos in Greek), his family name could become Kontoandreas (hence, the origin of the family name Konandreas). At Koupaki there were about 5-6 original families with these long composite family names who formed the nucleus of the village. Those were the families of Giannomitros, Kolimparis, Konandreas, Koufasimes, Nasiopoulos and Tsatouhas. Those who came from Messologi and Epirus after 1826, had two-syllable names e.g. Goumas, Nitsos, Soulias, Tsipras, Zohos, Zoupas, Zakkas etc.

The two World Wars and the Greek Civil War, following World War II, took a great toll on Koupaki, both in terms of life lost and material destruction.  From 329 inhabitants in 1940, only 187 had remained in 1951, partly as a result of war casualties and partly due to immigration. The village was never to regain its old past and by the end of the 1950s and 1960s, most of those that had remained left for the cities (mainly Athens). By the 1970 census, only 51 inhabitants were registered. All along, education was seen as the only real escape from the hardships of village life and most families sacrificed everything to see their children finishing school and entering university. This has not been in vain; Koupaki has one of the highest per capita university graduates in Greece.

The village has never lost the hearts and minds of its people wherever they may be and many of them (including from far away places such as California and New Zealand) converge to it, especially during the summer months, to remember the past and enjoy the fresh mountain air. Most of the houses, stone-built, have been renovated to benefit from modern amenities.  The village was connected to the regional road network in 1952 (dirt road) which was paved asphalt in the 1990s.  Electricity reached the village in the 1970s and the 1970s brought also individual telephone connection (until then the village was served by a single telephone located in the main grocery store in the centre of the village).

Koupaki has a beautiful church (Agios Georgios) and had a functioning elementary school until it closed in 1957 (because of the limited number of students who then were obliged to attend school at the nearby village of Zorianos). The school is now used as a museum for local arts and crafts. Koupaki is the birthplace of prominent individuals who excelled in the sciences, public life, international organizations and in business.

Contemporary news about Koupaki are printed in the quarterly 'To Koupaki mas' (Greek: Το Κουπάκι μας) published by the Koupaki community in Athens and distributed to the four corners of the world. News about Koupaki can also be found in the village website (in Greek). The village is  featured in the book "Better Dead Than Divorced: The Trial of Panayota" by  Lukas Thanasis Konandreas which describes the murder of his father's cousin Panayota Nitsos by her abusive husband in the 1950s and her family's efforts to bring the murderers to justice. The book won the 2015 Bronze Nonfiction Book Award.

Population of Koupaki over time

References 

Populated places in Phocis